Jayme Dee (born December 10, 1991) is an American singer-songwriter and musician from Los Angeles. Her recording of the song "Rules" charted in the United States after it was featured in the movie The Hunger Games. She has stated that her musical influences are Amy Winehouse, John Mayer, Frank Sinatra, and Etta James.

Early life
Jayme Dee was born in Redondo Beach, California. Her mother was a professional vocal coach and violin teacher, while her father was a pastor. Every Sunday, she sang in front of her church crowd. Before she reached middle school, she received extensive training with the classical piano. During her first year in high school, she discovered a guitar while cleaning her garage. This is when she started to write and sing songs while teaching herself guitar. She started her singing career on YouTube while attending the University of Southern California to study vocal performance. Dee recorded and uploaded acoustic covers of popular songs by Katy Perry, Taylor Swift, and Lady Gaga on YouTube. She soon gained popularity and dropped out of USC, after one semester, to focus on her music career.

Career
She performed on tour with Owl City from July to August 2012 in Toronto, New York City, Chicago, Minneapolis, Denver, Los Angeles, and Seattle.

She was signed by Republic Records in 2012, and soon afterwards was asked to record a song called "Rules" for the soundtrack The Hunger Games: Songs from District 12 and Beyond. Her song "Tip Toes" was released in 2012 as well. Her first EP, Broken Record, was released on July 30, 2013. She worked on it with Aaron Michael Cox before he died. In March 2014, Dee confirmed on her Instagram account that she had parted ways with her record label and is now an independent artist.

Personal life
Jayme Dee currently resides in Los Angeles with her husband, whom she wed in December 2012. The couple have a son born in 2013.

Discography

Singles
 Honey (2009)
 Love Whiplash (2010)
 Rules (2012)
 Tip Toes (2012)
 Till I Fall Asleep (2013)

EPs
Broken Record (2013)

References

Additional sources
 Jayme Dee: Star on the Rise | Cliché Magazine
 Jayme Dee Exclusive Interview: Cliché’s Music Corner | Cliché Magazine 
 Jayme Dee Instagram Share

External links
 

1991 births
Living people
People from Redondo Beach, California
Musicians from Los Angeles
Singers from California
21st-century American singers